Verne James Clemons (September 8, 1891 - May 5, 1959) was a professional baseball player. He played all or part of seven seasons in Major League Baseball, primarily as a catcher. He made his major league debut for the St. Louis Browns in 1916, then returned to the majors for the St. Louis Cardinals for six seasons, from 1919 until 1924.

In 474 games over seven seasons, Clemons posted a .286 batting average (364-for-1271) with 78 runs, 5 home runs, 140 RBI and 119 bases on balls. He finished his career with a .983 fielding percentage playing every inning in the majors as a catcher.

Sources

Major League Baseball catchers
St. Louis Browns players
St. Louis Cardinals players
Bartlesville Boosters players
Wichita Jobbers players
Pueblo Indians players
Wichita Witches players
Louisville Colonels (minor league) players
St. Paul Saints (AA) players
Baseball players from Iowa
1891 births
1959 deaths